A gubernatorial election was held on 26 August 2018 to elect the next governor of , a prefecture of Japan located in the north of the Shikoku island.

Candidates 
Source:
Keizo Hamada, 66, incumbent since 2010, former Finance Ministry bureaucrat. He was supported by LDP, Komeito, SDP and DPFP. 
Eiji Himeda, 62, backed by JCP.

Results

References 

2018 elections in Japan
Kagawa gubernational elections
Politics of Kagawa Prefecture